The 1916 Louisiana Industrial football team was an American football team that represented the Louisiana Industrial Institute—now known as Louisiana Tech University—as a member of the Louisiana Intercollegiate Athletic Association (LIAA) during the 1916 college football season. Led by A. Flack in his first and only season as head coach, Louisiana Industrial compiled an overall record of 2–4. Dewitt Milam was the team's captain.

Schedule

References

Louisiana Industrial
Louisiana Tech Bulldogs football seasons
Louisiana Industrial football